This list of Numéro cover models is a catalog of cover models who have appeared on the cover of Numéro magazine, starting with the magazine's first issue in March 1999.

1999

2000

2001

2002

2003

2004

2005

2006

2007

2008

2009

2010

2011

2012

2013

2014

2015

2016

2017

2018

2019

2020

2021

2022

2023

See also

 List of Numéro China cover models
 List of Numéro Russia cover models
 List of Numéro Tokyo cover models
 List of Numéro Korea cover models

External links
 Numéro
 Numéro France on Models.com